"Drive-In Saturday" is a song by English musician David Bowie from his 1973 album Aladdin Sane. It was released as a single a week before the album and, like its predecessor "The Jean Genie", became a Top 3 UK hit.

Music and lyrics
Heavily influenced by 1950s doo-wop, "Drive-In Saturday" describes how the inhabitants of a post-apocalyptic world in the future (Bowie once said the year was 2033) have forgotten how to make love, and need to watch old films to see how it is done. The narrative has been cited as an example of Bowie's "futuristic nostalgia", where the story is told from the perspective of an inhabitant of the future looking back in time.

Its composition was inspired by strange lights amidst the barren landscape between Seattle, Washington, and Phoenix, Arizona, as seen from a train at night on Bowie's 1972 US tour. The music featured Bowie's synthesizer and saxophone, while the lyrics name-checked Mick Jagger ("When people stared in Jagger's eyes and scored"), the model Twiggy ("She'd sigh like Twig the wonder kid"), and Carl Jung ("Jung the foreman prayed at work"). The reference to Jung is significant according to artist Tanja Stark, and heralds the pivotal influence of Jungian depth psychology frameworks upon his career.  She suggests the lyric "crashing out with sylvian" is a cryptic reference to the Sylvian fissure in the brain associated with visionary and hallucinatory experiences.

Recording and release
Bowie premiered the song live in November 1972—initially at either Pirate's World, Fort Lauderdale, Florida, or Celebrity Theatre, Phoenix—well before committing it to tape. He offered it for recording to Mott the Hoople but they turned it down, Bowie later saying that he did not know why they refused it. However, in his 1972 tour narrative, Diary of a Rock 'n' Roll Star, Mott leader Ian Hunter appears utterly perplexed by the song's pop complexity when Bowie plays it to him, writing that it has "a hell of a chord rundown". Bowie claimed on VH1's Storytellers that his frustration with Mott the Hoople's rejection of the song led to his shaving of his eyebrows during the Ziggy Stardust tour, an alteration that remained evident in photographs as late as 1974.

Bowie's studio version, recorded in New York on 9 December 1972, was released as a single on 6 April 1973, one week ahead of the album, and remained in the charts for 10 weeks, reaching No. 3 in the UK. The B-side, "Round and Round", was a cover of Chuck Berry's track "Around and Around", a leftover from the Ziggy Stardust sessions. Bowie encyclopedist Nicholas Pegg describes "Drive-In Saturday" as "arguably the finest track on Aladdin Sane", as well as "the great forgotten Bowie single", which he attributed to the fact that it was not issued on a greatest hits album until almost 20 years after its release. Biographer David Buckley has called "Drive-In Saturday" and "Rebel Rebel" Bowie's "finest glam-era singles".

Some commentators have ranked the song among Bowie's finest. In The Guardian, Alexis Petridis voted it in number 10 in his list of Bowie's 50 greatest songs in 2020, calling it a one of Bowie's best singles. In other lists, the song has ranked at number 26, 24 and 79 in NME, Uncut and Mojo, respectively. In a 2016 list ranking every Bowie single from worst to best, Ultimate Classic Rock placed "Drive-In Saturday" at number 49.

Charts

Personnel
According to Chris O'Leary:
 David Bowie – lead and harmony vocal, 12-string acoustic guitar, tenor saxophone, ARP synthesiser, handclaps, finger clicks
 Mick Ronson – electric guitar, harmony vocal, handclaps
 Trevor Bolder – bass
 Mick Woodmansey – drums, tambourine
 Mike Garson – piano

Production
 David Bowie – producer
 Ken Scott – producer

Live versions
 A live audience recording from The Public Hall, Cleveland, Ohio, on 25 November 1972 was released on the bonus disc of the Aladdin Sane - 30th Anniversary Edition in 2003.  Not included in that release was Bowie's introduction to the song, as follows:

 Bowie performed the song on Russell Harty Plus, a UK television show, on 17 January 1973.  This performance is included on the DVD version of Best of Bowie.
 In addition to live performances in 1972-1974, the song was performed by Bowie on his 1999 tour and is included on VH1 Storytellers (David Bowie album).

Other releases
It appears (in its album version) on several compilations:
 Sound + Vision (1989)
 The Singles Collection (1993)
 The Best of David Bowie 1969/1974 (1997)
 Best of Bowie (2002)
 The Platinum Collection (2006)
 Nothing Has Changed (2014)
 On 20 April 2013, a 40th Anniversary 7" picture disc of "Drive-in Saturday" was released as an exclusive for the Record Store Day. "Drive-In Saturday" was backed up with the "Russell Harty Plus Pop version" of the track.

References

Sources

1973 singles
David Bowie songs
Songs written by David Bowie
Song recordings produced by Ken Scott
Song recordings produced by David Bowie
RCA Records singles